David or Dave Allen may refer to:

Film and television
 Dave Allen (comedian) (1936–2005), Irish comedian
 David W. Allen (1944–1999), American film and television stop motion animator
 David Allen (special effects artist), American 1940s special effects artist
 Dave Allen (actor) (born 1958), American television and film actor
 David Allen, creator of BBC TV series Micro Live, 1980s

Music
 Daevid Allen (1938–2015), Australian guitarist, founder of progressive rock bands Soft Machine and Gong, 1960s
 Rockin' Dave Allen (1941–1985), American blues guitarist and singer
 Dave Allen (born 1952), flautist in Australian rock band Flake and Galadriel.
 Dave Allen (English musician) (born 1955), bassist for 1970s rock band Gang of Four
 David M. Allen (born 1953), British record producer
 David Clark Allen, singer and founder of rock band Carmen, 1970s
 Dave Allen (died 1986), guitarist and vocalist for punk band NOFX, 1990s and 2000s
 Dave Allen, American bassist for rock band Glassjaw, 1990s and 2000s
 Dave Allen, lead singer and guitarist for Irish rock band Hal, 2000s

Sports
 David Allen (baseball) (1858–1931), American baseball player
 David Allen (cricketer) (1935–2014), Gloucestershire cricketer
 David Rayvern Allen (1938–2014), cricket writer and historian
 David Allen (canoeist) (born 1943), British slalom canoeist
 David Allen (American football) (born 1978), American football running back
 Dave Allen (rugby league), rugby league pro footballer during 1980s
 David Allen (rugby union) (born 1981), English rugby union player
 David Allen (rugby league) (born 1985), Irish rugby league footballer of the 1980s
 Dave Allen (football executive) (born 1942), British sports businessman
 Dave Allen (boxer) (born 1992), British boxer

Other entertainment
 David Allen (playwright) (born 1936), Australian playwright
 David Allen (game designer) (born 1972), video game designer

Other people
 David Oliver Allen (1800–1863), American missionary
 William Edward David Allen (1901–1973), Irish-born English scholar, politician, and businessman
 David Allen (politician) (1937–2011), Irish politician
 David Allen (Royal Navy officer) (1933–1994), British Royal Navy officer, Defence Services Secretary 1988–1991
 David Allen (author) (born 1945), productivity trainer and consultant

See also
Scott-David Allen (born 1973), American musician
David Allan (disambiguation)
Allen (surname)
David Allyn (born 1969), American author, educator, and consultant to nonprofit organizations